The 2019–20 Liga Națională is the 62nd season of Liga Națională, the Romanian top-level women's professional handball league. The league comprises 14 teams. SCM Râmnicu Vâlcea are the defending champions, for the first time since 2013.

Team changes

To Liga Națională
Promoted from Divizia A
 Rapid București
 Slobozia

From Liga Națională
Relegated to Divizia A
 Danubius Galați
 Roman

Teams for season 2019–20

League table

Promotion/relegation play-offs
The 3rd and 4th-placed teams of the Divizia A promotion tournament faced the 11th and 12th-placed teams of the Liga Națională. The first two places promoted to Liga Națională and the last two relegated to Divizia A. The play-offs were played on neutral ground.

Season statistics

Number of teams by counties

References

External links
 Romanian Handball Federaration 

Liga Națională (women's handball)
2019 in Romanian sport
2020 in Romanian sport
2019–20 domestic handball leagues 
2019 in Romanian women's sport
2020 in Romanian women's sport